John Sebastián Armijo Armijo (born 8 November 1981) is a Chilean football manager, currently in charge of Deportes Antofagasta.

Career
Born in Cerrillos, Santiago, Armijo started his career as a fitness coach and joined Marcelo Bielsa's staff in the Chile national team, in 2007 as an assistant to fitness coach Luis María Bonini. He left the staff in 2010 after the 2010 FIFA World Cup, and subsequently worked as a fitness coach at Universidad Católica, O'Higgins, Santiago Wanderers, Cobreloa and Unión Española.

Armijo returned to O'Higgins in 2016 after acquiring his coaching license, and was named manager of the club's youth categories. On 1 August 2017, he was named interim manager after the resignation of Cristián Arán, He stayed in the role for two matches, and subsequently became an assistant of newly appointed Gabriel Milito.

After leaving O'Higgins in 2019, Armijo subsequently worked as a head of youth development at Barnechea before being named manager of Primera B side Deportes Melipilla on 16 December 2020. He led the club to the promotion play-offs, where his side achieved promotion after defeating Unión San Felipe on penalties.

At the same time that he works as manager of Barnechea, he performs as a football commentator and tactical analyst for both the digital media Redgol and the TV channel Vive from VTR.

References

External links

1981 births
Living people
People from Santiago Province, Chile
Sportspeople from Santiago
Chilean football managers
Chilean Primera División managers
Primera B de Chile managers
O'Higgins F.C. managers
Deportes Melipilla managers
Chilean association football commentators
Deportes Antofagasta managers